Báthory Castle or Báthory Citadel, also known as Șimleu Silvaniei Fort, is a historic fort in Romania, in the modern-day city of Șimleu Silvaniei. Since the 1590s, the castle was the main residence of the Hungarian Báthory family during the era of the Principality of Transylvania.

External links
 Şimleu Silvaniei, Báthory fortress

Gallery

References

Castles in Romania
History museums in Romania
Museums in Sălaj County
Historic monuments in Sălaj County
Șimleu Silvaniei
Báthory family